, also known as Hikobe, was a Japanese painter. He is first documented as a rice merchant in Osaka in the 1770s and 1780s. His go (artist's name), Beisanjin, literally meaning a mountain of rice, may either relate to his profession or reflect deference to the Northern Song period (960-1127).

Okada Beisanjin was a notable bunjinga painters.  The Japanese term bunjinga refers to a style of painting produced by literati (bunjin). Bunjinga traces its roots to the paintings of Chinese literati of the Song dynasty (960–1267).While Beisanjin employed a variety of styles in his paintings, his later works are characterized by forceful brushstrokes that create unusual forms and give texture to his images.

References

External links
Okada Beisanjin

1744 births
1820 deaths
Japanese painters